Obleševo is a village in the municipality of Češinovo-Obleševo, North Macedonia. It used to be a municipality of its own.

Demographics
According to the 2002 census, the village had a total of 1,131 inhabitants. Ethnic groups in the village include:

Macedonians 1,129
Serbs 1
Others 1

References

Villages in Češinovo-Obleševo Municipality